Kaanjuka is a surname. Notable people with the surname include:

Bernard Kaanjuka, Namibian football manager
Hitjivirue Kaanjuka (born 1987), Namibian sprinter